"Zip Gun Boogie" is a 1974 single, originally credited in the UK as a solo single by Marc Bolan of the British glam rock band T. Rex.  In other territories, the single was credited to "T. Rex" or "Marc Bolan and T. Rex"; almost all reissues of the track credit it solely to T. Rex.  The track and its B-side feature on the 1975 T. Rex album Bolan's Zip Gun.

The single was in the UK charts for a total of three weeks, peaking at No. 41, making it T. Rex's lowest charting single during Bolan's lifetime.

References

1974 singles
T. Rex (band) songs
Songs written by Marc Bolan
Song recordings produced by Marc Bolan
EMI Records singles
1974 songs